Enerum is a small village on the island Öland. It belongs to the municipality Borgholm.

Populated places in Borgholm Municipality